The Brooklyn Bridge–City Hall/Chambers Street station is a New York City Subway station complex in Lower Manhattan. The complex is served by trains of the IRT Lexington Avenue Line and the BMT Nassau Street Line. The station is served by the 4, 6, and J trains at all times; the 5 train at all times except late nights; the  train on weekdays in the peak direction; and the Z train during rush hours in the peak direction.

The complex comprises two stations, Brooklyn Bridge–City Hall and Chambers Street. The Brooklyn Bridge–City Hall station was built for the Interborough Rapid Transit Company (IRT), and was an express station on the city's first subway line. The station opened on October 27, 1904, as one of the original 28 stations of the New York City Subway. The Chambers Street station was built for the Brooklyn Rapid Transit Company (later the Brooklyn–Manhattan Transit Corporation, or BMT) as part of the Dual Contracts. The Nassau Street Line station opened on August 4, 1913. Several modifications have been made to both stations over the years, and they were connected within a single fare control area in 1948.

The Lexington Avenue Line station, under Centre Street, has two island platforms, two side platforms, and four tracks; the side platforms are not in use. The Nassau Street Line station, under the Manhattan Municipal Building, has three island platforms, one side platform, and four tracks; only the outer tracks and two of the island platforms are in use. The complex contains elevators that make it compliant with the Americans with Disabilities Act of 1990.

History 
The two adjacent stations on the IRT Lexington Avenue Line and BMT Nassau Street Line are connected by two passageways. The south one opened in 1914, and was placed inside fare control on July 1, 1948. A second passageway, at the north end of the stations, was opened in the evening of September 1, 1962, when the Lexington Avenue Line platforms were extended and the Worth Street station was closed. Originally, the stations were operated by separate companies: the Interborough Rapid Transit Company (IRT) and the Brooklyn–Manhattan Transit Corporation (BMT). The city government took over the BMT's operations on June 1, 1940, and the IRT's operations on June 12, 1940. Both sections of the station complex were listed on the National Register of Historic Places in 2005.

IRT Lexington Avenue Line

Construction and opening 

Planning for a subway line in New York City dates to 1864. However, development of what would become the city's first subway line did not start until 1894, when the New York State Legislature authorized the Rapid Transit Act. The subway plans were drawn up by a team of engineers led by William Barclay Parsons, chief engineer of the Rapid Transit Commission. It called for a subway line from New York City Hall in lower Manhattan to the Upper West Side, where two branches would lead north into the Bronx. A plan was formally adopted in 1897, and all legal conflicts concerning the route alignment were resolved near the end of 1899. The Rapid Transit Construction Company, organized by John B. McDonald and funded by August Belmont Jr., signed the initial Contract 1 with the Rapid Transit Commission in February 1900, in which it would construct the subway and maintain a 50-year operating lease from the opening of the line. In 1901, the firm of Heins & LaFarge was hired to design the underground stations. Belmont incorporated the Interborough Rapid Transit Company (IRT) in April 1902 to operate the subway.

The Brooklyn Bridge station was constructed as part of the IRT's original line south of Great Jones Street. The Degnon-McLean Contracting Company was awarded the contract for Section 1, from the City Hall loop to Chambers Street, and the contract for section 2, from Chambers Street to Great Jones Street. Work began on Section 1 on March 24, 1900, and work began on Section 2 on July 10, 1900. By late 1903, the subway was nearly complete, but the IRT Powerhouse and the system's electrical substations were still under construction, delaying the system's opening.

The Brooklyn Bridge station opened on October 27, 1904, as one of the original 28 stations of the New York City Subway from City Hall to 145th Street on the West Side Branch. Express trains were extended south on January 16, 1905, when a -long extension to Fulton Street opened.

Service changes and station renovations 
Initially, the IRT station was served by local and express trains along both the West Side (now the Broadway–Seventh Avenue Line to Van Cortlandt Park–242nd Street) and East Side (now the Lenox Avenue Line). West Side local trains had their southern terminus at City Hall during rush hours and South Ferry at other times, and had their northern terminus at 242nd Street. East Side local trains ran from City Hall to Lenox Avenue (145th Street). Express trains had their southern terminus at South Ferry or Atlantic Avenue and had their northern terminus at 242nd Street, Lenox Avenue (145th Street), or West Farms (180th Street). Express trains to 145th Street were later eliminated, and West Farms express trains and rush-hour Broadway express trains operated through to Brooklyn.

To address overcrowding, in 1909, the New York Public Service Commission proposed lengthening platforms at stations along the original IRT subway. As part of a modification to the IRT's construction contracts, made on January 18, 1910, the company was to lengthen station platforms to accommodate ten-car express and six-car local trains. In addition to $1.5 million (equivalent to $ million in ) spent on platform lengthening, $500,000 was spent on building additional entrances and exits. It was anticipated that these improvements would increase capacity by 25 percent. Six-car local trains began operating in October 1910. On January 23, 1911, ten-car express trains began running on the Lenox Avenue Line, and the following day, ten-car express trains were inaugurated on the West Side Line.

In 1918, the Lexington Avenue Line opened north of Grand Central–42nd Street, thereby dividing the original line into an "H"-shaped system. All trains were sent via the Lexington Avenue Line. With the closure of the City Hall station in 1945, Brooklyn Bridge became the southernmost station for local services that formerly terminated at City Hall.

In the late 1950s and early 1960s, the New York City Transit Authority undertook a $138 million (equivalent to $ in ) modernization project for the Lexington Avenue Line. As part of the project, platforms at Brooklyn Bridge were extended. Work on the reconstruction of the Brooklyn Bridge station started on May 18, 1959. Prior to the rebuild, the station's local platform could only accommodate four cars, resulting in delays. The platforms were lengthened, widened, and straightened. Originally, the island platforms narrowed at their northern ends to an unsafe width of only five feet. In addition, a new exit was provided at Reade Street and Lafayette Street and a new passageway under Reade Street was built connecting to the Chambers Street station on the BMT Nassau Street Line. At the center of the enlarged platforms, a new overhead passage was built, providing more direct access to the Municipal Building.

A signal tower, as well as maintainers' rooms, relay rooms, and tile walls on the unused western side platform, were completed in May 1960. The tile walls on the unused eastern side platform had been completed the previous December. The downtown platform was lengthened in 1961, and the uptown platform's extension opened the next year, on September 1, 1962. The platform extension project was substantially completed by the end of 1963. The platform extensions allowed the old platform extensions at the southern end of the station, which were used for express service, to be abandoned. These platform extensions had necessitated the use of gap fillers. This project, which cost $6 million, allowed trains on the 6 route to be lengthened to nine cars, and allowed express trains to open all doors at the station (previously the doors only opened in eight of the ten cars). Upon its completion, the Worth Street station to the north was closed due to its close proximity to the platform extensions, and the Brooklyn Bridge station was renamed Brooklyn Bridge–Worth Street.

Three elevators opened in 1992, making the station compliant with the Americans with Disabilities Act of 1990. The elevators cost $3.4 million (equivalent to $ million in ) and connected the mezzanine to the street and to each platform. The station's name was reverted to Brooklyn Bridge–City Hall in 1995. A renovation at the station was completed by 1996. It was one of thirteen stations citywide whose renovations were completed that year at a total cost of $127 million (equivalent to $ million in ).

BMT Nassau Street Line

Construction and opening 
After the original IRT opened, the city began planning new lines. The Centre Street Loop (later the Nassau Street Line) was approved on January 25, 1907, as a four-track line; it was to connect the Brooklyn Bridge, Manhattan Bridge, and Williamsburg Bridge via Centre Street, Canal Street, and Delancey Street. Construction contracts for the Nassau Street Line were awarded in early 1907. A proposed Tri-borough system was adopted in early 1908, incorporating the Broadway Line. Operation of the line was assigned to the Brooklyn Rapid Transit Company (BRT, subsequently the Brooklyn–Manhattan Transit Corporation or BMT) in the Dual Contracts, adopted on March 4, 1913.

The Chambers Street station was planned as a five-platform station. It would sit at the base of the Manhattan Municipal Building, a large office structure being planned for the city government. One of the conditions of an architectural design competition for the Municipal Building was that the building's internal structure could not block train tracks, stairways, or platforms. Although McKim, Mead & White were selected for the building's construction, their original plans were rejected by the city's buildings superintendent because he felt that the underlying layer of soil and sand was not strong enough to carry the building. This resulted in delays in the construction of the proposed Brooklyn loop line under the building.

The BRT station opened on August 4, 1913. Originally, trains arrived from the north via either the Williamsburg Bridge or the Manhattan Bridge; the connection to the Montague Street Tunnel had not yet been completed. The loop configuration permitted trains arriving in either direction from the BMT Fourth Avenue Line in Brooklyn to pass through Chambers Street and return to Fourth Avenue without having to reverse direction. The BMT Brooklyn Loops, a track connection to the Brooklyn Bridge that would have connected to the Williamsburg Bridge tracks, was planned in the station's design, though the connection was never opened. According to a 1916 report, the connection had been completed, for just over $740,000, but because the BRT did not want to pay the annual rental fee that was mandated for the usage of the connection, it went unused. The overpass across William Street was closed in 1913 to make way for the proposed connection. In 1929, the overpass was reopened after it became clear that the connection would not be built. The finished portions of the tunnel to the Brooklyn Bridge led directly to wine vaults under the bridge.

Service changes and station renovations 
Chambers Street was designed to be the BRT's Manhattan hub near City Hall; the business and population center of the city was still near Manhattan island's southern end at the time. Three years after the Chambers Street station opened, its platforms were so overcrowded that one newspaper article described them as "more dangerous during the rush hours than at the Grand Central or the Fourteenth Street Stations." However, by the mid-1920s, the subway itself was pushing the city's population north and leaving Chambers Street behind. The Nassau Street Loop was completed in 1931 south to the Montague Street Tunnel to Brooklyn, making the Chambers Street BMT station a through station. At this point, the BMT's center island platform and the two side platforms were closed. A new northern mezzanine was built in 1938 when the entrances under the north side of the Municipal Building were closed. The western side platform was demolished with the expansion of the IRT station between 1960 and 1962.

The Chrystie Street Connection, opened in 1967, severed the Nassau Street Line's connection to the Manhattan Bridge, so that the bridge tracks could connect instead to the uptown IND Sixth Avenue Line. The new connection preserved Nassau Street service via the Montague Street Tunnel, but trains were no longer able to run in a loop.

The Chambers Street station, having fallen into disuse over the years, was voted the ugliest station in the system in a 2003 poll. In May 2018, it was announced that the MTA would start renovating the Chambers Street station that August. At the time, local news station NY1 said: "It is easily one of the most decrepit stations in the city's entire system." The station received two platform elevators and three new ramps in the mezzanine: one in the corridor between the IRT and BMT stations, and one from the BMT mezzanine to each platform elevators. The station platforms were modified to reduce the gap between trains and the platform edges, and a pedestrian bridge was installed above the tracks, connecting both of the open platforms. To accommodate the ramps, elevators, and pedestrian bridge, portions of the station and mezzanine were removed or reconfigured. These improvements made the station compliant with the Americans with Disabilities Act of 1990, and were funded as part of the 2015–2019 MTA Capital Program. The project was to take at least 24 months to be completed. A contract for the elevators' construction was awarded in August 2018, and the elevators opened by September 1, 2020.

Station layout

Just below street level, there are two overpasses above the IRT platforms, one at the center of the station and another near the south end. There is also an underpass at the extreme north end of the station. The underpass and northern overpass date from the 1962 renovation while the southern overpass is part of the original circulation plan. The overpasses connect each platform with the exits and the BMT's southern mezzanine, and contain wrought iron balustrades. A corridor runs above the eastern side of the IRT station.

The BMT mezzanine level, slightly lower than the IRT mezzanine level, is split into north and south sections, with various offices and service rooms in the unused portions of both mezzanines. The connection to the IRT is within the southern mezzanine. The mezzanines contain tiled piers and walls, with pink wainscoting. Along the tops of the walls are yellow mosaic-tile bands with white-and-red surrounds and blue rectangular panels. The north mezzanine has a section of rectangular yellow tiled wall dating to the 1962 renovation. There is a doorway in the south mezzanine, topped by a stone lintel reading "Women", which formerly led to a women's restroom.

Exits

At the north end of the complex, two stairs extend from the IRT underpass to the northwestern corner of Reade and Centre Streets. The IRT underpass continues to the northern BMT mezzanine, where a stair rises to the southern end of Foley Square.

At the south end of the complex, a wide stair under the southern side of the Manhattan Municipal Building, just southeast of the intersection of Centre and Chambers Streets, serves the southern BMT mezzanine, and was one of the original BMT entrances. The wide stair has a bronze latticed balustrade, as well as plaques with the words . Two stairs and an elevator from the western side of the IRT mezzanine to City Hall Park, just southwest of the intersection of Centre and Chambers Streets, in front of the Tweed Courthouse. The stairs comprised the original entrance to the IRT station. The elevator, a replica of an original IRT subway entrance kiosk, opened in 1992 and was designed by Urbahn Associates.

A long passageway at the eastern side of the IRT mezzanine leads to a stair within a plaza just south of the Manhattan Municipal Building. This exit is smaller and faces the large BMT entrance under the building. At the far south end, two stairs rise to the south side of Frankfort Street, in front of Pace University's One Pace Plaza building.

Several entrances have been closed and slabbed over. One stair from the IRT mezzanine led directly to the Brooklyn Bridge walkway, and was removed by August 2000 as part of a project to widen the bridge walkway. Another stair rose from the northern BMT mezzanine to the northwestern corner of Centre Street and Duane Street (east of the current Foley Square entrance), though this was also sealed by 1992 to reduce the maintenance costs associated with maintaining two adjacent staircases. The northern BMT mezzanine contained bronze doors on the east wall, now sealed, which led to the Thurgood Marshall United States Courthouse. Under the northern side of the Manhattan Municipal Building were additional subway staircases, although this entrance area was closed by 1938.

BMT Nassau Street Line platforms

The Chambers Street station on the BMT Nassau Street Line is beneath the Manhattan Municipal Building, stretching from Duane Street in the north to a point just south of Chambers Street to the south. The J stops here at all times and the Z stops here during rush hours in the peak direction. The Chambers Street station has four tracks, three island platforms, and one side platform (originally two); the westernmost side platform has been demolished, while the center island platform and the easternmost side platform are unused. From the BMT station, there are stairs and elevators leading to the mezzanines above. The easternmost side platform had seven stairs, while the center island platform and the westernmost side platform had six stairs. The eastern island platform has five stairs and the western island platform has four stairs. The elevators are at the southern ends of the western and eastern island platforms.

The island platforms allow for cross-platform interchanges between local and express trains heading in the same direction. Terminating trains use the inner tracks while through trains use the outer tracks. The southbound platform is slightly higher at the southern end of the station because the next stop south, Fulton Street, is bi-level with the southbound platform being above the northern one.

Design

Like the IRT station, the tunnel is covered by a "U"-shaped trough that contains utility pipes and wires. Each platform consists of  concrete slabs, beneath which are drainage basins. The platforms contain double-height, tile-clad columns spaced every , which support the jack-arched concrete station roofs. There is a  gap between the trough wall and the platform walls, which are made of -thick brick covered over by a tiled finish. The ceiling is double-height above much of the station's length, but drops beneath the south mezzanine and the original north mezzanine.

The westernmost side platform was tiled over during the 1962 renovation; it contains yellow tiles and a cream trim line with  written on it in black sans-serif font at regular intervals. The easternmost side platform retains most of its original decoration, with pink marble wainscoting, as well as pink marble pilasters spaced every . Between the pilasters and above the wainscoting are panels made of white tile, with gold-tiled borders. A maroon, blue, and gold tile frieze runs atop each panel, interrupted by T-shaped ceramic plaques with depictions of the Brooklyn Bridge, which are situated atop each pilaster. The Brooklyn Bridge ceramic tiles display the bridge's vertical cables but do not depict its diagonal cables. At intervals of every three panels, there are tile plaques with the station's name in place of the frieze. Sections of the original design, including the ceiling and walls, are heavily damaged or deteriorated.

Track layout 

The two "express" tracks, currently unused in regular revenue service, merge into a single tail track south of the station.

North of this station, there are two stub tracks, which end behind the now-closed Queens-bound side platform. These tracks were formerly connected to the south tracks of the Manhattan Bridge, until they were disconnected in 1967 as part of the Chrystie Street Connection, with the BMT Broadway Line being connected to the south tracks instead. Also north of this station, the former southbound express track (now the northbound track) splits into two tracks just south of Canal Street: the former northbound local track, and the former southbound express track (the current northbound track).

IRT Lexington Avenue Line platforms

The Brooklyn Bridge–City Hall station is an express station on the IRT Lexington Avenue Line, beneath Centre Street. It stretches between a point just south of Duane Street, to the north, and Park Row, to the south. The 4 and 6 trains stop here at all times; the 5 train stops here at all times except late nights; and the <6> train stops here during weekdays in the peak direction. The station serves as the southern terminal for the 6 train, which turns via the City Hall Loop to head back uptown. The Brooklyn Bridge–City Hall station contains four tracks, two island platforms, and two unused side platforms. From each island platform, one elevator and one stair lead to the station's southern overpass, two stairs lead to the northern overpass, and one stair leads to the north-end underpass.

The island platforms allow for cross-platform interchanges between local and express trains heading in the same direction. Terminating trains use the outer tracks while through trains use the inner tracks. Platform extensions are at both ends of the original platforms. The ones at the south end are closed off, but contain gap fillers and original mosaic tiles. The 1962 platform extensions are at the north end; it was deemed easier to lengthen the express platform northward, as the curves at the south end were extremely difficult to reconstruct.

There are two unused side platforms, one beside either local track. A combination of island and side platforms was also used at 14th Street–Union Square on the IRT Lexington Avenue Line and 96th Street on the IRT Broadway–Seventh Avenue Line. These side platforms were built to accommodate extra passenger volume and were built to the five-car length of the original IRT local trains. When trains were lengthened, the side platforms were deemed obsolete, and they were closed and walled off in 1910. The side platforms house electrical equipment and are blocked off with metal grates. A staircase from the western side of the mezzanine leads to the original western side platform. A sliding grate was installed on the bottom of the deck leading to the eastern side platform, which was used to prevent access to that platform when it was not in service.

Design

As with other stations built as part of the original IRT, the station was constructed using a cut-and-cover method. The tunnel is covered by a "U"-shaped trough that contains utility pipes and wires. Each platform consists of  concrete slabs, beneath which are drainage basins. The platforms contain I-beam columns spaced every . Additional columns between the tracks, spaced every , support the jack-arched concrete station roofs. There is a  gap between the trough wall and the platform walls, which are made of -thick brick covered over by a tiled finish.

The westernmost side platform retains ten faience plaques of eagles, made by the Grueby Faience Company, which are not visible to the public. The easternmost side platform also has eagle faience plaques and mosaic tablets, also not visible to the public. These plaques and tablets were in the original design. The walls adjacent to the tracks are decorated with modern white tiles, surrounded near the top and bottom by red tile bands. The bands wrap around alcoves that are placed at regular intervals on the walls. The spaces above the alcoves contain black-on-green plaques with back-to-back "B"s, which alternate with white-on-green tablets with the words  in Arial font. Smaller white-on-green plaques with the words "City Hall" are above the  tablets. The back-to-back "B"s, and the white walls with red tile bands, are also used in the design of the mezzanine. However, the wall of the eastern corridor retains some original design, with brick wainscoting, marble pilasters, and original cream-on-olive plaques with back-to-back "B"s. The mosaic tiles at all original IRT stations were manufactured by the American Encaustic Tile Company, which subcontracted the installations at each station.

The 1996 artwork in this station, by Mark Gibian, is titled Cable Crossing. The sculpture consists of numerous cables hanging over the fare control area of the western mezzanine, a reference to the nearby Brooklyn Bridge.

Track layout 
This station is the zero point for the IRT East Side chain; mile 0 is at the south end of the station. Just north of the station are crossovers that allow trains to switch between the local and express tracks, which allow Lexington Avenue local trains to continue south via the express tracks if necessary (rather than using the City Hall loop).

South of the station, the downtown local track splits into three tracks. The westernmost track loops around to the northbound local track through the City Hall station. The other two are layup tracks parallel to the downtown express track. Until 1963, they merged into the downtown express track north of Fulton Street, but now they end at bumper blocks a little north of Fulton Street, and are occasionally used for train storage.

References

Further reading 
 Stokey, Lee (1994). Subway Ceramics: A History and Iconography. .

External links 

 
 
 Station Reporter—Brooklyn Bridge/Chambers Street Complex
 MTA's Arts For Transit—Brooklyn Bridge–City Hall/Chambers Street
 Forgotten NY—The Original 28 Subway Stations

Google Maps Street View:

 Entrance near City Hall Park 
 Entrance north of Brooklyn Bridge 
 Entrance south of Brooklyn Bridge 
 Reade Street and Centre Street entrance 
 Foley Square entrance 
 Centre Street entrance 
 IRT platforms 
 BMT platforms
 BMT mezzanine

Abandoned Stations:

 Brooklyn Bridge–City Hall platforms 
 Chambers Street platforms 

1904 establishments in New York City
1913 establishments in New York City
Beaux-Arts architecture in New York City
BMT Nassau Street Line stations
Brooklyn Bridge
Civic Center, Manhattan
IRT Lexington Avenue Line stations
New York City Subway stations in Manhattan
New York City Subway terminals
New York City Subway transfer stations
Railway and subway stations on the National Register of Historic Places in Manhattan
Railway stations in the United States opened in 1904
Railway stations in the United States opened in 1913

es:Calle Chambers (línea de la Calle Nassau)